Axel Harries (born 7 August 1964) is a German middle-distance runner. He competed in the men's 800 metres at the 1984 Summer Olympics.

References

1964 births
Living people
Athletes (track and field) at the 1984 Summer Olympics
German male middle-distance runners
Olympic athletes of West Germany
Place of birth missing (living people)
20th-century German people